The 1995–96 season was the 48th season in Vardar’s history and their fourth in the Macedonian First League. Their 1st place finish in the 1994–95 season meant it was their 4th successive season playing in the First League.

In the championship Vardar was finished third, below Sileks and Sloga Jugomagnat and were lost in the final of the Macedonian Cup against Sloga Jugomagnat after penalty shoot-out, but qualified for the 1996–97 UEFA Cup.

Competitions

Overall

First League

Classification

Results by round

Matches

Sources: RSSSF.no, Google Groups

Macedonian Football Cup

Source: Google Groups

UEFA Cup

References

FK Vardar seasons
Vardar